Kaliber is a Danish rap-band from Copenhagen made up of rappers DB King and Livid rapper and vocalists Face It and Mr. Mo.

They had a charting hit with "Det Dødt Nu" in 2013. They are well known for their song "Hardhitter" featuring Danish boxer Rudy Markussen and boxing announcer Kurt Thyboe.

Members
DB King (also known by the pseudonym Dennis) - rapper
Livid (also known by the pseudonym Jesper) - rapper
Face It (also known by the pseudonym Martin) - vocalist
Mr. Mo (also known by the pseudonym Mohammed) - vocalist

Members have also worked as solo artists and in other collaboration. Notable hits include: 
2012: Sleiman feat. DB King - "Badboy"
2015: DB King - "Ridah"
2016: Sleiman feat. Livid & Mellemfinga'Muzik - "Bomaye" (reached #1 on Tracklisten)

Discography

Albums

Singles

References 

Danish hip hop groups